Žernov may refer to places in the Czech Republic:

Žernov (Náchod District), a market town in the Hradec Králové Region
Žernov (Semily District), a municipality and village in the Liberec Region

See also
Zernov (surname)